The 1918–19 Michigan Wolverines men's basketball team represented the University of Michigan in intercollegiate basketball during the 1918–19 season. The team compiled an overall record of 16–8 and finished in fourth place in the Big Ten Conference with a 5–5 record against conference opponents.  Elmer Mitchell served as the coach, and John H. Emery was the team captain.  Arthur Karpus was the team's leading scorer with 188 points (61 field goals and 66 free throws) in 23 games for an average of 8.2 points per game.  Karpus's 188 points stood as Michigan's single season scoring record until the 1936–37 season when John Townsend scored 191 points.

Schedule

Players

Abe Cohn - aMa letter winner (varsity letter winner in football)
Elmer Cress
John H. Emery - forward and varsity letter winner
Timothy Y. Hewlett - forward and varsity letter winner
Arthur Karpus - forward and varsity letter winner
Loring
James I. McClintock - center and varsity letter winner
Frank Novak - winner of an "R" letter as a reserve player
Ralph O. Rychener - guard and varsity letter winner
Benjamin Weiss - aMa letter winner
F. Wickham
Jack L. Williams - guard and varsity letter winner
Wilford C. Wilson - guard and varsity letter winner

Scoring statistics

Source:

Coaching staff
Elmer Mitchell - coach
Harry W. Heffner - manager
Philip Bartelme - graduate director

References

Michigan
Michigan Wolverines men's basketball seasons
Michigan Wolverines basketball
Michigan Wolverines basketball